The Twin Islets form a close pair of small, steep-sided, granite islands, with a combined area of 5.61 ha, in south-eastern Australia.  They are part of Tasmania’s Hogan Group, lying in northern Bass Strait between the Furneaux Group and Wilsons Promontory in Victoria.

Fauna
Recorded breeding seabird and wader species include little penguin, short-tailed shearwater, fairy prion, common diving-petrel, Pacific gull and sooty oystercatcher.

References

Hogan Group